Stanislav Igorevich Zakharchenko (born 1 January 1994) is a Russian football midfielder.

Club career
He made his debut in the Russian Second Division for FC Taganrog on 18 September 2011 in a game against FC Rotor Volgograd.

He made his Russian Football National League debut for FC Mordovia Saransk on 31 July 2016 in a game against FC SKA-Khabarovsk.

References

External links
 
 
 Career summary by sportbox.ru

1994 births
People from Matveyevo-Kurgansky District
Living people
Russian footballers
Association football midfielders
FC Taganrog players
FC Chernomorets Novorossiysk players
FC Mordovia Saransk players
PFC Spartak Nalchik players
Sportspeople from Rostov Oblast